Četereže is a village in the municipality of Žabari, Serbia. According to the 2002 census, the village has a population of 641 people.

Notable people
Rada Manojlović, pop-folk singer

References

Populated places in Braničevo District